P68 may refer to:

Vessels 
 , a submarine of the Royal Navy and, as HNoMS Utstein (P68), of the Royal Norwegian Navy
 , a corvette of the Indian Navy
  of the Republic of Singapore Navy

Other uses 
 DDX5, RNA helicase p68
 Ford P68, a racing car
 NetBurst (microarchitecture)
 P68 holin family
 Papyrus 68, a biblical manuscript
 Partenavia P.68, or Vulcanair P68, an Italian light aircraft
 Vultee XP-68 Tornado, a proposed American high-altitude interceptor aircraft
 P68, a state regional road in Latvia